Apmaan Ki Aag is a 1990 Indian Hindi-language action drama film directed by Talukdars and produced by Vijay K. Ranglani. It stars Govinda, Sonam in the lead roles.

Plot
Living in a Chawl in Dongri, Bombay, Vikrant Narayan Singh (Govinda) dreams of being wealthy, romances Mona (Sonam), the only child of widower & Retired Colonel Suryadev Singh (Kader Khan), and sends money to his village-based widowed mother. While celebrating Mona's birthday at Hotel Sea Princess, he is humiliated and assaulted by J.D. Chaudhary (Gulshan Grover) and Monty Nagpal (Satish Shah) and decides to file a police complaint. It is this decision that will not only change his life forever but also alienate him from Mona, as well as compel him to join the underworld headed by Monty's dad.

Cast
 Govinda as Vikrant Narayan Singh "Vicky"
 Sonam as Mona Singh
 Kader Khan as Retired Colonel Suryadev Singh
 Aruna Irani as Mrs. Singh
 Satish Shah as Monty Nagpal
 Kiran Kumar as Kailash
 Gulshan Grover as J.D. Chaudhary
 Vikram Gokhale as Police Commissioner S.R. Chaudhary
 Rakesh Bedi as Vasu
 Dinesh Hingoo as Daruwala
 Mahavir Shah as Inspector Damodar

Soundtrack
The music was composed by Nadeem-Shravan.

References

External links

1990s Hindi-language films
1990 films
Films scored by Nadeem–Shravan
Indian action drama films